Edward Chen Hao-sen (born 2 August 1996) is a Taiwanese actor and singer. He is currently studying performing arts at Hsing Wu University. He is known for his roles in the 2017 drama series  and the 2020 feature film Your Name Engraved Herein. For his role in Your Name Engraved Herein, Chen was nominated for Best New Performer at the 57th Golden Horse Awards.

Career 
Chen is known for his roles in LGBT-themed productions, notably the 2017 series Red Balloon and the 2020 film Your Name Engraved Herein. In 2020, he signed a recording contract with Huayan Music and recorded the theme song for Your Name Engraved Herein.

When asked if he was reluctant to be typecast in queer roles, Chen said: "The role settings in the scripts are very different. If I classify these characters into the same ethnic group, of course everyone in this ethnic group is still different. Personality, different backgrounds, and different stories. The trick for me is actually to let go of myself, completely believe in the events that the character does, and then study and establish it."

Filmography

Film

Television series

Awards and nominations

References

External links 

1996 births
Living people
21st-century Taiwanese male actors
Taiwanese male television actors
Taiwanese male film actors